George Alan Yancey (born September 8, 1962) is an American professor of sociology at the Baylor University, where he has taught since 2019. He is known for his research on anti-Christian attitudes in the contemporary United States, and the ways in which it can influence the decisions made by academic sociologists. He has been called "the only researcher studying Christianophobia at a secular university".

Yancey is a supporter of the American Solidarity Party.

References

External links
 
 

1962 births
Living people
African-American social scientists
American Christian democrats
American sociologists
Baylor University faculty
People from Moses Lake, Washington
21st-century African-American people
20th-century African-American people